Colilodion, sole member of the tribe Colilodionini, is a genus of beetles belonging to the family Staphylinidae and comprising eight species from Southeast Asia.

Ecology 
Species of the genus Colilodion are presumed to be myrmecophiles due to the presence of trichomes retaining ant pheromones.

Systematics 
The exact systematic placement of the genus remains uncertain; it is the only member of the Colilodionini tribe, sharing certain characteristics with Clavigeritae, where it was originally placed by Claude Besuchet in 1991, and others that resemble the Pselaphitae. Eight species have been described:
 Colilodion concinnus Besuchet, 1991
 Colilodion incredibilis Besuchet, 1991
 Colilodion inopinatus Besuchet, 1991
 Colilodion mirus Besuchet, 1991
 Colilodion schulzi Yin & Cuccodoro, 2016
 Colilodion tetramerus Löbl, 1998
 Colilodion thienmu Nomura & Sugaya, 2007
 Colilodion wuesti Löbl, 1994

References

Bibliography 
 

Clavigeritae
Pselaphinae genera